Woodlands is a census-designated place in San Luis Obispo County, California. "The Woodlands" is a 956-acre master planned community with single- and multi-family homes, a resort hotel, retail and office space, located adjacent to Nipomo, California. The 2010 United States census reported Woodlands's population was 576.

Geography
According to the United States Census Bureau, the CDP covers an area of 1.7 square miles (4.3 km), all of it land.

Demographics
The 2010 United States Census reported that Woodlands had a population of 576. The racial makeup of Woodlands was 541 (93.9%) White, 7 (1.2%) African American, 0 (0.0%) Native American, 18 (3.1%) Asian, 1 (0.2%) Pacific Islander, 3 (0.5%) from other races, and 6 (1.0%) from two or more races. Hispanic or Latino of any race were 27 persons (4.7%).

The Census reported that 576 people (100% of the population) lived in households, 0 (0%) lived in non-institutionalized group quarters, and 0 (0%) were institutionalized.

There were 271 households, out of which 31 (11.4%) had children under the age of 18 living in them, 212 (78.2%) were opposite-sex married couples living together, 5 (1.8%) had a female householder with no husband present, 0 (0%) had a male householder with no wife present.  There were 9 (3.3%) unmarried opposite-sex partnerships, and 4 (1.5%) same-sex married couples or partnerships. 39 households (14.4%) were made up of individuals, and 12 (4.4%) had someone living alone who was 65 years of age or older. The average household size was 2.13.  There were 217 families (80.1% of all households); the average family size was 2.31.

The population was spread out, with 38 people (6.6%) under the age of 18, 18 people (3.1%) aged 18 to 24, 63 people (10.9%) aged 25 to 44, 305 people (53.0%) aged 45 to 64, and 152 people (26.4%) who were 65 years of age or older.  The median age was 59.2 years. For every 100 females, there were 93.9 males.  For every 100 females age 18 and over, there were 96.4 males.

The homeowner vacancy rate was 15.8%; the rental vacancy rate was 0%.  544 people (94.4% of the population) lived in owner-occupied housing units and 32 people (5.6%) lived in rental housing units.

References

Census-designated places in San Luis Obispo County, California
Census-designated places in California